Raymond John Elliott – Known as Jack Elliott (23 March 1929 – is a Welsh footballer who played as a centre forward in the Football League.

References

External links

1929 births
2006 deaths
Welsh footballers
People from Ystrad
Sportspeople from Rhondda Cynon Taf
Association football forwards
Oxford United F.C. players
Woking F.C. players
Millwall F.C. players
English Football League players